Piove di Sacco is a comune (municipality) in the Province of Padua in the Italian region Veneto, located about  southwest of Venice and about  southeast of Padua.

The municipality of Piove di Sacco contains the frazioni (subdivisions, mainly villages and hamlets) Corte, Tognana, Piovega and Arzerello.

Piove di Sacco borders the following municipalities: Arzergrande, Brugine, Campagna Lupia, Campolongo Maggiore, Codevigo, Pontelongo, Sant'Angelo di Piove di Sacco.

Demographic evolution

Twin towns
Piove di Sacco is twinned with:

  Senden, Germany
  Kobierzyce, Poland

References

Cities and towns in Veneto